Soumitra may refer to:
Soumitra Chatterjee (born 1935), Bengali film actor, famous for working in Satyajit Ray's films
Soumitra Dutta, author, academic, and businessman
Soumitra Mohan (born 1938), Hindi poet
Soumitra Sen (born 1958), retired judge of the Calcutta High Court

Indian masculine given names